Gary Sheffield (born 1968) is a Major League Baseball player.

Gary Sheffield may also refer to:

 Gary Sheffield (bobsleigh) (1936–2004), American bobsledder
 Gary Sheffield (historian), British military historian